Esporte Clube Mamoré is a Brazilian football team, from the city of Patos de Minas, Minas Gerais.

History
On June 13, 1949, Esporte Clube Mamoré was founded.

In 2001, the club disputed the Campeonato Brasileiro Série C, being eliminated in the first stage.

Current squad (selected)

Titles
 Champion of Campeonato de Patos de Minas (1956, 1956, 1957, 1958, 1960, 1961 e 1962)
 Champion of Campeonato Mineiro da Terceira Divisão (1990)
 Champion of Campeonato Mineiro da Segunda Divisão (1991)
 Champion of Supercopa Minas Gerais (1993)
 Champion of Campeonato Mineiro do Interior (1995)
 Champion of Campeonato Mineiro Módulo II (2000)
 Champion of Campeonato Mineiro do Interior (2001)

Mamoré anthem
Leão de Formosa wrote the anthem, while José Dias dos Reis provided the music.

Symbol and mascot
Its symbol and mascot is the toad, or sapo in Portuguese.

External links
Official Site

 
Association football clubs established in 1949
Football clubs in Minas Gerais
1949 establishments in Brazil